Hamal is a surname. Notable people with that surname include:

Belgium
 Henri-Guillaume Hamal (1685–1752), musician and composer who lived and worked in Liège

Nepal (Nepali:हमाल)
 Arun Hamal, Nepalese Engineer
 Rajesh Hamal, Nepalese actor

Surnames of French origin
Surnames of Nepalese origin
Khas surnames